The Valparaiso Crusaders men's soccer team represented Valparaiso University (Valpo) in NCAA Division I soccer competition as a member of the Missouri Valley Conference  The Crusaders played home matches at Brown Field on the Valpo campus in Valparaiso, Indiana.

History
Valparaiso began playing men's soccer in 1983. The Beacons were a charter member of the Association of Mid-Continent Universities in 1982 and entered Mid-Con soccer competition in 1988. In 2007, Valpo began a ten-year all-sports membership in  the Horizon League. In May 2017, the Missouri Valley Conference extended an invitation for the Crusaders to join; after concluding conference play for the year, Valparaiso accepted the invitation on May 25, with the move being effective on July 1.

Following the 2019 NCAA Division I men's soccer season, Valparaiso will cut the sport and men's tennis in order to allow greater attention to the school's other sports teams.

Honors
Sources:

Mid-Continent Conference
Player of the Year – J.J. Ruane, 1998

Newcomer of the Year – Scott Daly, 1998

Tournament MVP – Tony Dal Santo, 1997

All-Mid East Team – Tony Dal Santo, 1996 & 1997

Coach of the Year – Mis’ Mrak. 1997, 1998, 2002

Horizon League
Defensive Player of the Year – Stefan Antonijevic, 2011

Goalkeeper of the Year – Ryan Schwarz, 2007; Kyle Zobeck, 2011 & 2012; Nico Campbell, 2015

Coach of the Year – Mike Avery, 2011

Record By Year

References

External links
 Valpo Discontinued sports

 
Association football clubs established in 1983
Association football clubs disestablished in 2020
1983 establishments in Indiana
2020 disestablishments in Indiana